The following is a list of rulers of the Kingdom of Janjero. Janjero was situated in southwestern Ethiopia, in the angle formed by the Omo and the Jimma Gibe Rivers; to the west lay the Kingdom of Jimma and to the south the Kingdom of Garo. It existed from the 15th century to 1894.

List of Rulers of the Janjero state of Gimira
Koynab = Rulers

See also
Monarchies of Ethiopia
Rulers and heads of state of Ethiopia

Janjero
 
Janjero